Catenochytridium is a genus of fungi in the family Endochytriaceae. The genus contains six species known from Japan and North America.

References

External links

Chytridiomycota genera